

Headline events of the year
As a result of a players' strike, the MLB season ended prematurely on August 11, 1994. No postseason (including the World Series) was played. Minor League Baseball was not affected. During the shortened Major League Baseball season, the league adorned uniforms and stadiums to announce the 125th anniversary of baseball's first professional team, the Cincinnati Red Stockings. The Yomiuri Giants also celebrated their sixtieth anniversary with their eighteenth championship in the Japan Series.

Considered by some to be among history's greatest athletes, Michael Jordan suited up for the Birmingham Barons, the Class AA affiliate of the Chicago White Sox.  He played in his first game on April 9, going 0-for-3.

Champions

Nippon Professional Baseball
Japan Series: Yomiuri Giants over Seibu Lions (4-2).
Series Most Valuable Player:  Hiromi Makihara
Series Fighting Spirit Award:  Kazuhiro Kiyohara

Minor League Baseball -- AAA Leagues
American Association:  Indianapolis Indians
International League:  Richmond Braves
Mexican League:  Mexico City Red Devils
Pacific Coast League:  Albuquerque Dukes

Other champions
Baseball World Cup: Cuba
Caribbean World Series: Tigres del Licey (Dominican Republic)
College World Series: Oklahoma
Cuban National Series: Villa Clara over Industriales
Japan Series: Yomiuri Giants over Seibu Lions (4-2)
Korean Series: LG Twins over Pacific Dolphins
Big League World Series: Taipei, Taiwan
Junior League World Series: Thousand Oaks, California
Little League World Series: Coquivacoa, Maracaibo, Venezuela
Senior League World Series: Brandon, Florida
Taiwan Series: Brother Elephants

Awards and honors
Baseball Hall of Fame
Steve Carlton
Leo Durocher
Phil Rizzuto
Most Valuable Player
Frank Thomas (AL) Chicago White Sox
Jeff Bagwell (NL) Houston Astros
Cy Young Award
David Cone (AL) Kansas City Royals
Greg Maddux (NL) Atlanta Braves
Rookie of the Year
Bob Hamelin (AL) Kansas City Royals
Raúl Mondesí (NL) Los Angeles Dodgers
Manager of the Year Award
Buck Showalter (AL) New York Yankees
Felipe Alou (NL) Montreal Expos
Woman Executive of the Year (major or minor league): Naomi Silver, Rochester Red Wings, International League
Gold Glove Award
Don Mattingly (1B) (AL)
Roberto Alomar (2B) (AL)
Wade Boggs (3B) (AL)
Omar Vizquel (SS) (AL)
Ken Griffey Jr. (OF) (AL)
Kenny Lofton (OF) (AL)
Devon White (OF) (AL)
Iván Rodríguez (C) (AL)
Mark Langston (P) (AL)
Jeff Bagwell (1B) (NL)
Craig Biggio (2B) (NL)
Matt Williams (3B) (NL)
Barry Larkin (SS) (NL)
Barry Bonds (OF) (NL)
Marquis Grissom (OF) (NL)
Darren Lewis (OF) (NL)
Tom Pagnozzi (C) (NL)
Greg Maddux (P) (NL)

Statistical leaders

Major League Baseball final standings

 On September 14, the remainder of the major league season was cancelled by acting commissioner Bud Selig after 34 days of the players' strike.

American League

National League

Events

January
January 12 – Steve Carlton is elected to the Baseball Hall of Fame by the Baseball Writers' Association of America, receiving almost 96% of the vote. Orlando Cepeda falls seven votes short of the 75% required for election.

February
February 7 – Basketball superstar Michael Jordan signs a minor league contract with the Chicago White Sox. He is invited to spring training with the team as a non-roster invitee.
February 15 – Ila Borders becomes the first woman to pitch in a college game. Appearing for Southern California College of Cosa Mesa, Borders throws a five-hit, 12–1 victory against Claremont-Mudd-Scripps.
February 25 – The Veterans Committee elects Phil Rizzuto and Leo Durocher to the Baseball Hall of Fame.

March

April
April 3 – The Cincinnati Reds host an opening night game on Easter Sunday against the  St. Louis Cardinals. It is the first time in Major League history that a season opens with a night game instead of a day game. Only 32,803 attend the game, which is criticized by many Reds fans at the time as breaking tradition.
April 4 – At Wrigley Field, Chicago Cubs outfielder Tuffy Rhodes blasts three home runs on Opening Day, victimizing New York Mets pitcher Dwight Gooden. Rhodes becomes the first player in Major League history to hit home runs in his first three at-bats of the season. In spite of Rhodes’ unexpected home run barrage, the Cubs lose the game, 12–8.
April 8 – Kent Mercker of the Atlanta Braves pitches a 6–0 no-hitter against the Los Angeles Dodgers at Dodger Stadium, striking out 10 in the process. For Mercker, it is his first complete game in the Major Leagues. In the first half of the ninth inning, Chan Ho Park comes on to pitch for the Dodgers, becoming the first Korean player to appear in a Major League game. It is still the Braves most recent no-hitter as of 2022.
April 27 – In a first for the Hubert H. Humphrey Metrodome, Scott Erickson of the Minnesota Twins no-hits the Milwaukee Brewers 6–0.

May

June
June 13 – Ryne Sandberg announces his retirement from the Chicago Cubs.

July
July 8 – In a game against the Seattle Mariners, shortstop John Valentin of the Boston Red Sox records the tenth unassisted triple play in Major League history. It is the first unassisted triple play for a player in the American League since 1968, which is also the last time it is accomplished by a shortstop. Boston wins, 4–3. In addition, it is the debut game for Alex Rodriguez in the Major Leagues.
July 12 – Moisés Alou's double in the 10th inning gives the National League an 8–7 victory over the American League in the All-Star Game. The NL is now a perfect 9–0 in extra-inning contests. John Hudek of the Houston Astros becomes the first pitcher in Major League history to appear in an All-Star Game before recording a victory in the regular season. Fred McGriff, whose two-run home run in the ninth inning ties the score, takes MVP honors.
July 14 – Ozzie Smith of the St. Louis Cardinals records his 8,017th assist, breaking Luis Aparicio's MLB record for shortstops.
July 18 – Trailing 11–0 to the St. Louis Cardinals, the Houston Astros come back to win 15–12 in Houston.
July 19 – Two hours before the Seattle Mariners are scheduled to play the Baltimore Orioles, four tiles fall from the ceiling of the Kingdome, causing that night's game to be canceled and forcing the Mariners to play their final 20 games of the season on the road before the season is cut short by the players' strike.
July 28:
The Major League Baseball Players Association executive board sets August 12 as a strike date.
Kenny Rogers of the Texas Rangers throws the fourteenth perfect game in Major League history against the California Angels.

August
August  5 – Atlanta Braves first baseman Fred McGriff hit his 30th home run of the season in the Braves' 16–6 victory over the Cincinnati Reds, making him only the 9th player in Major League Baseball history to hit 30 or more homers in seven consecutive seasons.
August 11:
The final games of the Major League Baseball season are played on this date. The next day, the players' strike begins. Minor League Baseball games are not affected.
The Colorado Rockies unknowingly play their last game at Mile High Stadium, losing 13–0 to the Atlanta Braves. Greg Maddux throws a 3-hit shutout for Atlanta.

September
September 14 – The owners of the Major League clubs vote 26–2 to officially cancel the remainder of the 1994 season, including the playoffs and World Series. There is no World Series for the first time since 1904.
September 20 – The Albuquerque Dukes end the professional baseball season in the United States, winning the Pacific Coast League championship.

October
October 22 – The Japan Series begins as baseball's professional championship.  Reporters from major American newspapers arrive in Japan for their Fall Classic coverage.  Ken Harrelson, the play-by-play announcer for the Chicago White Sox, calls the Japan Series for US audiences on regional sports networks under the Prime SportsChannel banner.
October 29 – The Yomiuri Giants win Game 6 of the Japan Series to become professional baseball's World Champions. Legend says this is the luckiest of all championship years, as it is the team's sixtieth anniversary, as they are deemed world champions by some baseball media.

November
November 4 – Free agent pitcher Dwight Gooden is suspended for the entire 1995 season after testing positive for cocaine while already serving a 60-day suspension for a previous positive cocaine test.

December

Movies
Angels in the Outfield
Baseball: A Film by Ken Burns (TV)
Cobb
Home Run: Baseball in the Movies (TV)
Little Big League
Major League II
Scout, The

Births

January
January 1 – LaMonte Wade
January 2 – Félix Jorge
January 4 – Reynaldo López
January 10 – Rico Garcia
January 15 – Skye Bolt
January 16 – Austin Allen
January 17 – Colin Poche
January 18 – Diego Castillo
January 18 – Max Fried
January 20 – Ricardo Pinto
January 21 – Jake Cronenworth
January 22 – Tyrone Taylor
January 23 – Humberto Arteaga
January 23 – Addison Russell
January 24 – Jared Koenig
January 31 – Cole Irvin
January 31 – Jake Thompson
January 31 – Rob Whalen

February
February 3 – Brooks Kriske
February 3 – Rougned Odor
February 4 – Chris Gittens
February 4 – Raimel Tapia
February 6 – David Paulino
February 11 – Dansby Swanson
February 15 – Tzu-Wei Lin
February 20 – Luis Severino
February 21 – Sam Hilliard
February 23 – Joe McCarthy
February 27 – Matt Peacock
February 28 – Yonathan Daza

March
March 2 – James Kaprielian
March 3 – Dilson Herrera
March 3 – José Rondón
March 5 – John Schreiber
March 6 – Domingo Acevedo
March 7 – Zach Green
March 7 – Jairo Labourt
March 8 – Jake Noll
March 9 – Yennier Canó
March 15 – Mike Brosseau
March 15 – Sean Poppen
March 15 – Norge Ruiz
March 16 – Kyle Funkhouser
March 20 – Justin Garza
March 22 – Drew Anderson
March 22 – Edwin Díaz
March 22 – Daniel Robertson
March 24 – Kevin Ginkel
March 29 – Matt Olson
March 30 – Alex Bregman
March 31 – Ryan Borucki

April
April 1 – David Dahl
April 4 – Renato Núñez
April 6 – Ralph Garza Jr.
April 7 – Josh Hader
April 7 – Joel Payamps
April 8 – Zach Eflin
April 9 – Caleb Baragar
April 12 – Tomas Nido
April 15 – Trey Wingenter
April 16 – Albert Almora
April 21 – Ryan Hartman
April 21 – Edwin Ríos
April 22 – Aristides Aquino
April 23 – Garrett Cleavinger
April 25 – Cody Ponce
April 26 – Trevor Lane
April 27 – Michael Rucker
April 27 – Corey Seager
April 28 – Ben Braymer
April 28 – Thomas Pannone
April 29 – Scott Kingery
April 30 – José Peraza

May
May 1 – Dillon Tate
May 2 – Penn Murfee
May 3 – Walker Lockett
May 4 – Ryan Meisinger
May 5 – Beau Sulser
May 7 – Ángel Perdomo
May 8 – Lewis Brinson
May 10 – Lucas Sims
May 10 – Andy Young
May 11 – Jackson Stephens
May 12 – Jesmuel Valentín
May 14 – Tony Gonsolin
May 16 – Heath Fillmyer
May 18 – Randy Rosario
May 22 – Rio Ruiz
May 24 – Cam Hill
May 25 – Kyle Holder
May 25 – Donnie Walton
May 26 – Sam Haggerty
May 27 – José Berríos
May 27 – Josh Guyer
May 27 – Danny Young
May 28 – Ryan Burr
May 29 – Robbie Perkins
May 29 – Ka'ai Tom
May 30 – Brett Phillips
May 30 – Collin Wiles
May 31 – Dylan Cozens
May 31 – David Fletcher

June
June 1 – Andrew Stevenson
June 2 – Andrew Moore
June 3 – Harrison Bader
June 3 – Ramón Urías
June 3 – Brandon Waddell
June 4 – Yency Almonte
June 4 – Cody Stashak
June 6 – Brandyn Sittinger
June 7 – Ryder Jones
June 20 – Tom Eshelman
June 22 – Engelb Vielma
June 24 – Tim Lopes
June 26 – Eli White
June 28 – José Cuas
June 29 – Travis Lakins
June 30 – Rogelio Armenteros
June 30 – Joshua Rojas

July
July 1 – Jaylin Davis
July 1 – Chris Flexen
July 5 – Shohei Ohtani
July 6 – Andrew Benintendi
July 6 – Brandon Lowe
July 8 – Stephen Gonsalves
July 8 – Patrick Weigel
July 10 – Josh Rogers
July 11 – Jon Duplantier
July 12 – JD Hammer
July 13 – Ty France
July 14 – Tyler Alexander
July 14 – Jake Cousins
July 14 – Lucas Giolito
July 14 – Carson Kelly
July 14 – Andrew Velazquez
July 15 – Ramón Laureano
July 16 – Phil Diehl
July 17 – Josh Lester
July 18 – Ryan Helsley
July 19 – Mauricio Dubón
July 20 – Anthony Alford
July 20 – Duane Underwood Jr.
July 22 – Tanner Scott
July 28 – Walker Buehler
July 30 – Cody Poteet

August
August 1 – Dylan Lee
August 2 – Mark Mathias
August 4 – Orlando Arcia
August 4 – Brett Kennedy
August 8 – Kazuki Tanaka
August 9 – Kyle Cody
August 9 – Ben DeLuzio
August 10 – Chance Adams
August 12 – Ian Happ
August 18 – Seiya Suzuki
August 19 – Alex De Goti
August 23 – Billy McKinney
August 24 – Jamie Callahan
August 24 – Steven Wilson
August 25 – Johan Quezada
August 26 – Tyler Wells
August 28 – Kelvin Gutiérrez
August 29 – Seth Martinez
August 29 – Alex Reyes
August 30 – Taylor Hearn

September
September 2 – Franchy Cordero
September 2 – Rob Kaminsky
September 6 – Clint Frazier
September 6 – Harold Ramírez
September 9 – Wil Crowe
September 10 – Ray Kerr
September 10 – Dustin Peterson
September 11 – Ryan Aguilar
September 11 – Evan Phillips
September 12 – Tyler Danish
September 14 – Jake Brentz
September 14 – John King
September 15 – Tres Barrera
September 15 – Dakota Hudson
September 17 – Daniel Castano
September 17 – Anderson Severino
September 17 – Mike Shawaryn
September 19 – Luke Raley
September 20 – Kramer Robertson
September 21 – Devin Williams
September 22 – Carlos Correa
September 22 – Corey Ray
September 27 – Alex Call
September 27 – Luis Guillorme
September 27 – Pedro Payano
September 28 – Manuel Margot
September 29 – Thomas Hatch
September 29 – Tyler Mahle
September 30 – Travis Demeritte
September 30 – Damon Jones

October
October 1 – Cedric Mullins
October 3 – Jen-Ho Tseng
October 4 – Shea Spitzbarth
October 5 – Víctor Reyes
October 7 – Kirby Snead
October 7 – Kohl Stewart
October 8 – Gosuke Katoh
October 8 – Cody Thomas
October 10 – David Bednar
October 10 – Garrett Hampson
October 10 – Sean Murphy
October 12 – Max Schrock
October 13 – José Godoy
October 17 – Adam Oller
October 17 – Myles Straw
October 19 – Brandon Bailey
October 19 – Anthony Santander
October 20 – Ronald Guzmán
October 21 – Ben Bowden
October 21 – José Ruiz
October 22 – Corbin Burnes
October 24 – Trey Amburgey
October 24 – Peter Strzelecki
October 24 – Taylor Widener
October 26 – Jack Kruger
October 26 – Joe Palumbo
October 29 – Shaun Anderson

November
November 1 – Anthony Misiewicz
November 1 – Brent Rooker
November 2 – Jonathan Loáisiga
November 4 – Willie Calhoun
November 9 – Erick Mejia
November 13 – Santiago Espinal
November 16 – Will Craig
November 17 – Adonis Rosa
November 18 – Jimmy Lambert
November 20 – Jake Newberry
November 20 – Jacob Robson
November 21 – Elier Hernández
November 22 – Griffin Jax
November 23 – Tyler Wade
November 25 – Seranthony Domínguez
November 25 – Justin Lawrence
November 27 – Brennon Lund
November 28 – Miguel Díaz
November 28 – Cooper Hummel
November 30 – Tanner Tully

December
December 2 – Bryan Baker
December 7 – Pete Alonso
December 9 – Hunter Harvey
December 10 – Nestor Cortés Jr.
December 10 – Sheldon Neuse
December 14 – Ryan McMahon
December 14 – Chuckie Robinson
December 15 – Johneshwy Fargas
December 15 – David MacKinnon
December 16 – Ryan Hendrix
December 16 – Oscar Mercado
December 20 – Dane Dunning
December 22 – C. J. Chatham
December 22 – Richie Martin
December 24 – Miguel Castro
December 24 – Fernando Romero
December 25 – Nabil Crismatt
December 25 – Zach Jackson
December 28 – Darío Agrazal
December 28 – Mitch White
December 29 – Dustin Fowler
December 29 – Brian Navarreto
December 29 – Chris Okey
December 31 – Dawel Lugo

Deaths

January
January   2 – Eddie Smith, 80, two-time All-Star pitcher for the  Philadelphia Athletics, Chicago White Sox and Boston Red Sox in a span of ten seasons from 1936–1947, also known as the pitcher whom Joe DiMaggio started his legendary 56-game hitting streak on May 15, 1941.     
January   4 – Billy Sullivan Jr., 83, catcher who played 962 games over 12 seasons spanning 1931 to 1947 for seven MLB teams; his father, Billy Sr., was top-flight catcher during first two decades of the 20th century.
January   5 – Jack Brittin, 69, pitcher who appeared briefly for the Philadelphia Phillies in the 1950 and 1951 seasons. 
January   8 – Harvey Haddix, 68, three-time All-Star and two-time Gold Glove pitcher for the St. Louis Cardinals, Philadelphia Phillies, Cincinnati Reds, Pittsburgh Pirates and Baltimore Orioles from 1952 through 1965, who will always be remembered for throwing a perfect game over 12 full innings while pitching for Pittsburgh against the Milwaukee Braves on May 26, 1959; he lost the perfecto, the no-hitter, the shutout, and the game in the 13th inning after a fielding error, one-out intentional walk, and a double by Joe Adcock (which would have been a home run had he not passed Hank Aaron on the bases), saddling Haddix with a one-hit, 1–0 defeat; later a pitching coach for five MLB clubs between 1966 and 1984.
January   9 – Johnny Temple, 66, six-time All-Star second baseman who played for the Cincinnati Reds and Redlegs, Cleveland Indians, Baltimore Orioles and Houston Colt .45s from 1952 to 1964, hitting .300 or better three times and tying for the National League lead in walks in 1957 with 94, while receiving 648 walks and striking out only 338 times in 6,035 plate appearances.
January 10 – Chub Feeney, 72, National League president from 1970 to 1986, then briefly club president of the San Diego Padres (1987–1988); previously vice president and de facto general manager of the New York and San Francisco Giants from 1946 through 1969; grandson of Charles Stoneham and nephew of Horace Stoneham.
January 11 – Joe Sprinz, 91, backup catcher who played with the Cleveland Indians from 1930 to 1931 and for the St. Louis Cardinals in 1933.
January 11 – Lucas Turk, 95, pitcher 1922, for the Washington Senators.
January 14 – Sam Vico, 70, first baseman who played from 1948 to 1949 for the Detroit Tigers.
January 22 – Rudy Miller, 93, backup infielder for the 1929 Philadelphia Athletics.
January 23 – Stan Landes, 70, National League umpire (1955–1972) who worked 2,874 NL games, three World Series and three All-Star games.
January 24 – Pat Crawford, 91, infielder for three different National League teams from 1929 to 1934, including the 1934 World Champions St. Louis Cardinals.
January 27 – Sherm Feller, 75, Boston radio personality who was the public address announcer at Fenway Park from 1967 through 1993; also a composer of popular songs.

February
February   6 – Bill Chamberlain, 84, pitcher for the 1932 Chicago White Sox. 
February   6 – Ross Grimsley, 71, pitcher who played for the Chicago White Sox in 1951, also the father of pitcher Ross Grimsley III.
February   6 – Frank Whitman, 69, shortstop who played for the Chicago White Sox in a span of two seasons from 1946–1948.
February   8 – Robert O. Reynolds, 79, broadcasting executive and business partner of Gene Autry's who, with Autry, was a founding co-owner of the Los Angeles Angels when they entered the American League in 1961; served as president of the Angels through 1975; star tackle for Stanford University's gridiron team who became member of the College Football of Fame.
February   9 – Ray Lamanno, 74, All-Star catcher for the Cincinnati Reds during five seasons between 1941 and 1948.
February   9 – Joe Mowry, 85, backup outfielder for the 1933 Boston Braves.
February   9 – Sam Parrilla, 50, Puerto Rican left fielder who played with the Philadelphia Phillies in its 1970 season.
February 12 – Ray Dandridge, 80, Hall of Fame third baseman of the Negro leagues and Minor League Baseball, who posted a career average of .355, appeared in three East–West All-Star Games, and earned American Association MVP Award honors in 1951.
February 15 – Ray Blemker, 56, pitcher who appeared in just one game for the Kansas City Athletics in 1960.
February 24 – Bill Clemensen, 74, pitcher for the Pittsburgh Pirates during three World War II-interrupted seasons spanning 1939–1946.
February 24 – Jim McKnight, 57, third baseman whose career lasted for 19 years from 1955–1972, including stints for the Chicago Cubs in 1960 and 1962; managed Class A Decatur Commodores in 1972, while appearing in 1,954 minor league games; father of Jeff McKnight.

March
March   1 – Joe Tipton, 72, backup catcher who appeared in 417 games from 1948–1954 for four American League teams; in a one-sided trade, swapped by the White Sox to the Philadelphia Athletics even up for eventual Hall of Famer Nellie Fox on October 19, 1949; in 1959, as a minor leaguer, embroiled in a gambling controversy that resulted in banishment from Organized Ball.
March   2 – Butch Sutcliffe, 78, catcher for the 1938 Boston Bees. 
March   4 – Louis Brower, 93, shortstop who played with the Detroit Tigers in 1931.
March   7 – Stew Hofferth, 81, catcher who played in 136 games from 1944 through 1946 for the Boston Braves.
March   9 – Elbie Fletcher, 77, All-Star first baseman who played for the Boston Braves and Bees and Pittsburgh Pirates in a span of 12 seasons from 1934–1949.
March 10 – Jim Brenneman, 53, pitcher who made three appearances for the New York Yankees in 1965, and also was the winning pitcher of their 1965 Hall of Fame exhibition game against the Philadelphia Phillies at Doubleday Field in Cooperstown.
March 10 – Jim Honochick, 76, American League umpire (1949 to 1973) who worked in 3,815 regular-season games, six World Series and four All-Star games.
March 12 – Gordy Coleman, 59, first baseman who played from 1959 through 1967 for the Cleveland Indians and the Cincinnati Reds and helped the Reds capture the 1961 National League pennant.
March 13 – Buddy Rosar, 79, solid defensive catcher for the New York Yankees, Cleveland Indians, Philadelphia Athletics and Boston Red Sox in 13 seasons from 1939 through 1951, also a five-time All-Star and member of the 1941 World Series champion Yankees, who is one of only three catchers in Major League history to catch at least 100 games in a single season without committing an error, while setting a record for consecutive games without an error by a catcher.
March 14 – Tony Freitas, 95, pitcher for the Philadelphia Athletics and the Cincinnati Reds during six seasons spanning 1932–1936, who also earned the most career wins by a left-handed Minor League pitcher with 342, while tying for first with twenty or more wins during nine seasons.
March 16 – Eric Show, 37, pitcher for the San Diego Padres and Oakland Athletics over eleven seasons from 1981–1991, who gained notoriety for giving up Pete Rose his 4,192nd hit, which surpassed the long-standing record for most career hits held by Ty Cobb. 
March 23 – Roger Wolff, 82, knuckleball pitcher who played for the Philadelphia Athletics, Washington Senators, Cleveland Indians and Pittsburgh Pirates during seven seasons spanning 1941–1947.
March 25 – Bob Fontaine Sr., 70, general manager of the San Diego Padres from September 23, 1977 to July July 6, 1980; former minor-league pitcher who also served as a scout and scouting/player development director between 1951 and 1992.
March 29 – Ray Bare, 44, pitcher who played for the St. Louis Cardinals and Detroit Tigers in part of four seasons from 1972–1977.

April
April   2 − Gil Paulsen, 91, who made a pitching appearance with the St. Louis Cardinals in its 1925 season.
April   5 − Bobby Hofman, 68, backup infielder who played for the New York Giants during seven seasons between 1949 and 1957, including the 1954 World Series champion team, and later coached for three American League clubs from 1966 through 1978.
April   6 − William Ford, 80, pitcher for the Detroit Tigers in the 1945 season.
April   6 – Goody Rosen, 81, Canadian All-Star center fielder who played for the Brooklyn Dodgers and New York Giants over six seasons spanning 1937–1946; member of the Canadian Baseball Hall of Fame. 
April 17 – Walter Wilson, 80, pitcher for the 1945 Detroit Tigers.
April 19 – Virginia Bell, 66,  All-American Girls Professional Baseball League pitcher and outfielder, who also served for the Women's Army Corps in Japan during World War II.
April 24 – Martinez Jackson, 89, Negro leagues second baseman who played for the Newark Eagles in the 1930s, best known for being the father of Hall of Famer Reggie Jackson.
April 25 – Gordon Jones, 64, pitcher who spent 10 seasons in the majors, beginning his career in 1954 with the  St. Louis Cardinals and then moved onto the New York and San Francisco Giants, Baltimore Orioles and Kansas City Athletics, before finishing with the Houston Colt .45s and Astros between 1964 and 1965.
April 25 – Mike Kreevich, 85, All-Star center fielder who played for the Chicago Cubs, Chicago White Sox, Philadelphia Athletics, St. Louis Browns and Washington Senators in a span of twelve seasons from 1931–1945, while hitting .300 or better four times and leading the American League in triples with 16 in 1937.

May
May   2 – Buck Fausett, 86, 19-year minor league veteran who played in 13 games as a third baseman and pitcher as a 36-year-old rookie for the Cincinnati Reds during wartime 1944 season.
May   5 – Tony DePhillips, 81, backup catcher who played in 1943 for the Cincinnati Reds.
May   9 – Ralph Brickner, 69, pitcher for the 1952 Boston Red Sox.
May   8 – Jim Finks, 66, player and longtime executive in professional football (Calgary Stampeders, Minnesota Vikings, Chicago Bears) who served two seasons (1983–1984) as the president of the Chicago Cubs.
May 11 – Bennie Warren, 82, catcher who  played for the Philadelphia and the New York Giants in a span of six seasons from 1939–1947.
May 12 – Si Johnson, 87, pitcher who went 101–165 (4.09) in 492 mound appearances with the Cincinnati Reds, St. Louis Cardinals, Philadelphia Phillies and Boston Braves in all or part of 17 seasons spanning 1928–1947. 
May 15 – Showboat Fisher, 95, outfielder who played for the Washington Senators, St. Louis Cardinals and St. Louis Browns over during four seasons between 1923 and 1932, as well as the last surviving member of the 1924 Senators, the first MLB club based in Washington, D.C. to win a World Series title.
May 26 – Red Treadway, 74, backup outfielder who played from 1944 to 1945 for the New York Giants.

June
June   1 – Bill Webb, 80, pitcher for the 1943 Philadelphia Phillies.
June   2 – Mort Flohr, 82, pitcher who played for the Philadelphia Athletics during the 1934 season.
June 10 – Vic Bradford, 79, outfielder for the New York Giants in 1943
June 12 – Jim Brock, 57, coach at Arizona State since 1972 who led the school to two College World Series titles.
June 14 – Monte Weaver, 87, pitcher who posted a 71–50 record in 201 games between 1931 and 1939 for the Washington Senators and Boston Red Sox; went 22–10 for 1932 Senators and was a member of their AL champions the following season. 
June 16 – Marlin Stuart, 75, pitcher for the Detroit Tigers, St. Louis Browns, Baltimore Orioles and New York Yankees in a span of six seasons from 1949–1954.
June 20 – Norm Wallen, 76, third baseman for the Boston Braves during the 1945 season.
June 23 – Joe Dobson, 77, All-Star pitcher who posted a 137-103 record in 14 seasons from 1939–1954, playing his first two years with the Cleveland Indians, nine with the Boston Red Sox and three with the Chicago White Sox, as he helped lead the Red Sox to the 1946 American League pennant with a 13-7 record and following up with a career-best 18-8 season in 1947, while throwing a four-hitter to give Boston a 3-2 lead in the 1946 World Series over the St. Louis Cardinals, and pitching in relief in two other games of the Series, which the Cardinals won in Game 7.
June 23 – Marv Throneberry, 62, back up first baseman for the New York Yankees, Kansas City Athletics and Baltimore Orioles over part of five seasons before joining the expansion New York Mets in 1962, with whom he became a starter for the first time; the 1962 club, dubbed the Amazin' Mets, posted a 40–120 record in its inaugural season and were one of the laughingstocks of baseball for much of the 1960s.
June 27 – Alan Strange, 87, backup shortstop for the St. Louis Browns and Washington Senators during five seasons spanning 1934–1942.
June 29 – Ray Mueller, 82, All-Star catcher—nicknamed Iron Man—for the Boston Braves and Bees, Cincinnati Reds, New York Giants and Pittsburgh Pirates in 14 seasons between 1935 and 1951; set a National League record with 233 consecutive games caught between 1943 and 1946; started every one of Cincinnati's 155 regular-season games and caught 1,355 of the club's 1,398 defensive innings played in 1944. 
June 30 – Don Kolloway, 75, second baseman and first baseman who during his 14-year career included stints with the Chicago White Sox, Detroit Tigers and Philadelphia Athletics from 1940–1953.

July
July   4 – Cal Cooper, 71, pitcher for the Washington Senators in the 1948 season.
July   4 – Tex Hoyle, 72, relief pitcher for the Philadelphia Athletics during the 1952 season. 
July   5 – Bernie DeViveiros, 93, shortstop who played with the Chicago White Sox in 1924 and for the Detroit Tigers in 1927; longtime scout and base-running instructor.
July 13 – Jimmie Reese, 93, infielder for the New York Yankees (when his roommate was Babe Ruth) and St. Louis Cardinals from 1930–1932; later a longtime coach in the Pacific Coast League and, in the majors, for the California Angels (1973 until his death).
July 14 – César Tovar, 54, infield/outfield utility player who spent a dozen seasons in the majors, most notably with the Minnesota Twins from 1965 to 1972; second major leaguer (after Bert Campaneris) to play all nine positions in a game (1968); once hit a walk-off home run to hit for the cycle; regarded as the all-time leader in breaking up no-hit attempts (five); led the American League in doubles, triples, and hits at different points in his career.
July 19 – Idona Crigler, 72, All-American Girls Professional Baseball League player.
July 26 – Roland Gladu, 83, Canadian third baseman for the 1944 Boston Braves.
July 26 – Herm Holshouser, 87, pitcher who played in 25 games for the 1930 St. Louis Browns.
July 31 – Hy Vandenberg, 88, pitcher for the Boston Red Sox, New York Giants and Chicago Cubs in a span of seven seasons between 1935 and 1945, and also a member of the Giants and Cubs teams that clinched the National League pennant in 1937 and 1945, respectively.

August
August   1 – Bernie James, 88, middle infielder in 114 career games for 1929–1930 Boston Braves and 1933 New York Giants; member of 1933 World Series champions.
August   2 – Dick Jones, 92, pitcher who played for the Washington Senators in the 1926 and 1927 seasons.  
August   7 – Nev Chandler, 47, Cleveland sportscaster who teamed with ex-pitcher Herb Score on Indians' radio broadcasts from 1980 to 1984.
August 15 – Joe Brovia, 72, who made 21 appearances as a pinch-hitter with the 1955 Cincinnati Redlegs, previously a prolific hitter and long time All-Star outfielder at Triple-A Pacific Coast League between 1941 and 1955, while collecting a lifetime .311 average with 214 home runs, 1,846 hits and 1,144 RBIs in 1,805 games.  
August 23 – Jim Prendergast, 77, pitcher who played for the Boston Braves in 1948.
August 25 – Cliff Garrison, 88, pitcher for the 1928 Boston Red Sox. 
August 27 – Sig Gryska, 79, shortstop who played from 1938 to 1939 with the St. Louis Browns.
August 28 – Dain Clay, 74, outfielder for the Cincinnati Reds in a span of four seasons from 1943–1946. 
August 31 – Mike Garbark, 78, backup catcher for the New York Yankees over two seasons between 1944 and 1945.

September
September   1 – Bob Greenwood, 66, Mexican pitcher for the Philadelphia Phillies during two seasons from 1954–1955.
September   5 – Hank Aguirre, 63, three-time All-Star pitcher who played for four teams in 16 seasons from 1955–1970, spending most of his career with the Detroit Tigers from 1958 to 1967, whose best season came in 1962, when he went 16–8 and led the American League with a 2.21 ERA.
September   6 – Rita Briggs, 65, AAGPBL All-Star catcher.
September 12 – Hunter Lane, 94, third baseman for the 1924 Boston Braves .
September 16 – Harry Chozen, 78, catcher who appeared in just a game for the Cincinnati Reds in 1937. 
September 16 – Shirley Stovroff, 63, AAGPBL catcher and a member of two championship teams.
September 28 – Owen Scheetz, 80, pitcher who appeared in six games for the Washington Senators in 1943.

October
October   5 – Lee Gamble, 84, backup left fielder for the Cincinnati Reds over parts of four seasons from 1935–1940, including the team that won the National League pennant in 1939. 
October   7 – Stan Ferens, 79, left-handed pitcher who played in 53 total games for the St. Louis Browns during the 1942 and 1946 seasons.
October 11 – Bobby Brooks, 48, backup outfielder who played from 1969 through 1972 for the Oakland Athletics and California Angels.
October 11 – Charlie Cuellar, 77, pitcher for the 1950 Chicago White Sox.
October 17 – Joe Paparella, 85, American League umpire for 20 years (1946–1965) who worked in four World Series, four All-Star contests, and 3,143 league games.
October 25 – George Fallon, 80, middle infielder who played with the Brooklyn Dodgers in 1937 and for the St. Louis Cardinals from 1943 to 1945.  
October 30 – Frank Coggins, 50, backup second baseman for the Washington Senators and Chicago Cubs in a span of three seasons from 1967–1972.

November
November   4 – George Bradshaw, 70, catcher for the 1952 Washington Senators.
November   5 – Gene Desautels, 87, light-hitting catcher with a good glove and strong arm, who spent 19 years in baseball, including 13 major league seasons with the Detroit Tigers, Boston Red Sox, Cleveland Indians and Philadelphia Athletics between 1930 and 1946.
November   5 – Joe Hague, 50, first baseman and right fielder who played from 1968 through 1973 for the St. Louis Cardinals and Cincinnati Reds.
November   5 – Tim McNamara, 95, pitcher for the Boston Braves and New York Giants during five seasons from 1922 to 1926. 
November   6 – Erv Dusak, 74, two-way player who pitched and played at first base and outfield for the St. Louis Cardinals and the Pittsburgh Pirates, appearing in ten seasons spanning 1941–1952 and helping St. Louis win the 1946 World Series, while going 0–3 with a 5.33 ERA in 23 pitching appearances, and  hitting a slash line of .243 / .334 / .355 with 24 home runs and 106 RBI in 413 career games.
November 11 – Ed Madjeski, 86, catcher who played for the Philadelphia Athletics, Chicago White Sox and New York Giants over part of four seasons from 1932–1937.
November 16 – Russ Meers, 75, pitcher for the Chicago Cubs during three seasons between 1941 and 1947.
November 27 – Glen Moulder, 77, pitcher who played with the Brooklyn Dodgers, St. Louis Browns and Chicago White Sox over three seasons from 1946 to 1948. 
November 29 – Charley Smith, 57, solid defensive third baseman who hit .239 with 69 home runs and 281 RBI in 10 seasons for seven different teams from 1960 to 1969, perhaps best known for being involved in some of the most significant trades of the 1960s, as a key component in deals that included renowned All-Stars such as Ken Boyer, Turk Farrell, Roger Maris and Roy Sievers.

December
December   3 – Woody Abernathy, 79, pitcher who worked in 16 games, 15 in relief, for the New York Giants (1946–1947).
December   3 – Earl Johnson, 75, pitcher whose career spanned seven seasons from 1941–1951, playing with the Boston Red Sox and Detroit Tigers, who was also notable for being a World War II hero, as his actions earned him a Silver and Bronze Star for his meritorious service in a hazardous mission.
December   4 – Russ Scarritt, 91, left fielder who played from 1929 through 1932 for the Boston Red Sox and Philadelphia Phillies, who in 1929 set a still-standing record for a Red Sox rookie with 17 triples in a season.
December   7 – Frank Sacka, 70, catcher who played for the Washington Senators in the 1951 and 1953 seasons.
December 20 – Larry Crawford, 80, pitcher for the 1937 Philadelphia Phillies.
December 20 – Bob Wellman, 69, outfielder and first baseman for the Philadelphia Athletics in 1948 and 1950; managed for a quarter-century in the Minor Leagues, winning more than 1,600 games, with his 1966 Spartanburg Phillies setting a Western Carolinas League record by ripping off a 25-game winning streak. 
December 26 – Allie Reynolds, 77, six-time All-Star pitcher for the Cleveland Indians and New York Yankees over 13 seasons spanning 1942–1954, who became the first MLB pitcher to throw two no-hitters in a single season and led the American League in shutouts and strikeouts two times and in ERA once, being also an MVP Award runnerup in 1952 and a part of six Yankees World Series Champion teams between 1947 and 1953.
December 26 – Tony Robello, 81, second baseman who played in 16 games for 1933–1934 Cincinnati Reds; spent almost 50 years as a scout for four teams, including the Reds, for whom he signed Hall-of-Fame catcher Johnny Bench and other stars. 
December 31 – Mona Denton, 78, pitcher for the South Bend Blue Sox and Kenosha Comets of the All-American Girls Professional Baseball League.
December 31 – Jack Shepard, 63, catcher for the Pittsburgh Pirates over all or part of four seasons spanning 1953–1956; the Stanford graduate left baseball in the prime of his career and became a successful business executive and philanthropist.

Sources

External links

Major League Baseball official website 
Minor League Baseball official website 
Baseball Almanac – Major League Baseball Players Who Died in 1994